Food Allergy Research & Education (FARE) is a non-profit organization dedicated to food allergy awareness, research, education, and advocacy. The organization provides information, programs, and resources about food allergies and anaphylaxis, a severe, potentially life-threatening allergic reaction. Working on behalf of more than 32 million Americans who have potentially life-threatening food allergies, FARE’s mission is to improve the quality of life and health of those with food allergies, and to provide hope for the development of new treatments. 

FARE formed in 2012 through the merger of two food allergy patient advocacy organizations: the Food Allergy & Anaphylaxis Network (FAAN), a clearinghouse for food allergy information founded in 1991 by the parent of a child with food allergies, and the Food Allergy Initiative (FAI), founded in 1998 by concerned parents and grandparents who were committed to advancing food allergy research. The new organization combined FAAN’s expertise in patient education with FAI’s leadership in research funding. As FARE marks its 10th anniversary in 2022, the organization’s donor-supported investments in food allergy research, education and advocacy totaled $100 million.

Research 
FARE has developed research infrastructure to support advances in the understanding, management, treatment and prevention of food allergy. Initiated in 2015 and expanded in 2020, the FARE Clinical Network is a coalition of academic, research, and clinical care centers specializing in food allergy. In 2021, 51 FARE Clinical Network centers conducted more than 45 food allergy clinical trials and treated 250,000 food allergy patients in 23 states and the District of Columbia. FARE has also established a food allergy patient registry as well as a biobank and biorepository and a data coordination center to support FARE Clinical Network research. These initiatives support the development of a centralized food allergy patient data platform to facilitate food allergy research breakthroughs world-wide.

FARE co-funded the Learning Early About Peanut Allergy (LEAP) study, published in 2015, which has led to a shift in national dietary guidelines to encourage introduction of age-appropriate peanut foods during infancy to lower infant risk of developing peanut allergy. Additional FARE-supported research studies work on investigating early introduction of multiple food allergens, desensitization to multiple food allergens using allergen-specific immunotherapies and allergen-non-specific medications, and improved methods of food allergy diagnosis.

Education and awareness 
Educational materials developed by FARE help patients and families manage and mitigate allergen exposure risk while easing the stress and anxiety associated with this life-changing and potentially life-threatening disease. FARE’s cross-channel resources include online training courses, e-learning and in-person events, food service certification, and a college search tool to help prospective students with food allergies compare the dining and other campus accommodations available for food-allergic students are more than 1,100 colleges and universities. FARE has developed resources to educate and inform children, teens and adults with food allergies, their families and caregivers, educators and school staff serving all ages and grade levels, food service workers, healthcare providers, and the research community.

Through media and awareness programs, FARE helps people better understand the daily challenges of managing food allergies. Since 2014, FARE has promoted the Teal Pumpkin Project to make Halloween festivities safe and fun for children with food allergies and other dietary restrictions. Originating as Halloween-themed food allergy awareness activity of the Food Allergy Community of East Tennessee (FACET) support group, the Teal Pumpkin Project encourages households to display a teal pumpkin and offer non-food treats in a separate bowl, so that children who can’t safely touch or consume food-based treats can participate in trick-or-treating. Households that participate in the Teal Pumpkin Project are located throughout the U.S. and in other countries and territories worldwide. 

FARE’s legacy organization, FAAN, initiated Food Allergy Awareness Week in 1998. Food Allergy Awareness Week is commemorated each year during the second week in May.

Advocacy
Through the efforts of a community of more than 65,000 grassroots food allergy advocates, FARE organizes support policies that have a positive impact on members of the food allergy community. On the national level, FARE was instrumental in the passage of the Food Allergen Labeling and Consumer Protection Act of 2004 (FALCPA). As a result of FALCPA, the presence of eight major food allergens (milk, egg, wheat, soy, finned fish, crustacean shellfish, peanuts, and tree nuts) must be indicated, in simple terms, on packaged food items. FARE was also central in advocating for the Food Allergy Safety, Treatment, Education and Research Act of 2021 (FASTER), which passed both houses of Congress with overwhelming bipartisan support. Starting in 2023, the FASTER Act will require that sesame be labeled in plain language on packaged goods as the ninth major food allergen.

Additional areas of FARE’s advocacy focus include access to epinephrine, the only treatment that can halt symptoms of the severe allergic reaction called anaphylaxis; bring in school policies to protect the safety of food-allergic students; increased federal funding for food allergy research; access to safe foods, specialized food allergy care and opportunities to participate in research for food-allergic individuals living in underserved and under-resourced communities.

See also
 Food allergy in the United States
 Anaphylaxis
 Peanut allergy
 Type I hypersensitivity
 Alpha-Gal allergy

References

External links
 Food Allergy Research and Education

Food allergy organizations
501(c)(3) organizations
Non-profit organizations based in Virginia